Fancy Dance is a 2023 drama film directed by Erica Tremblay in her feature directorial debut, from a screenplay by Tremblay and Miciana Alise.

It premiered at the 2023 Sundance Film Festival on January 20, 2023.

Cast
Lily Gladstone as Jax
Isabel Deroy-Olson as Roki
Ryan Begay as JJ
Shea Whigham as Frank
Audrey Wasilewski as Nancy
Dennis Newman as Derrick

Production
In December 2020, the screenplay of Fancy Dance was selected as one of The Indigenous List, initiated by The Black List, IllumiNative and Sundance Institute to spotlight the work of Native American writers. In May 2022, the screenplay also was featured in the Cannes Screenplay List.

In August 2022, it was announced that Erica Tremblay would direct the film with Confluential Films set to produce. The principal photography took place in Tulsa, Oklahoma and began in August 2022.

Release
Fancy Dance had its world premiere at the 2023 Sundance Film Festival, on January 20, 2023. Cercamon acquired its worldwide distribution rights on February 16, 2023. It is also set to screen at the 2023 South by Southwest.

Reception
 The website's consensus reads, "An urgent drama grounded in its observant depiction of reservation life, Fancy Dance establishes director/co-writer Erica Tremblay as a rising filmmaking talent".

References

External links
 

2023 directorial debut films
Films about Native Americans
2023 independent films
American drama films
American LGBT-related films
2023 LGBT-related films
2020s American films
2023 drama films